National Route 409 is a national highway of Japan connecting Takatsu-ku, Kawasaki and Narita, Chiba in Japan, with a total length of 119.3 km (74.13 mi).

See also
 Tokyo Bay Aqua-Line—part of Japan National Route 409

References

External links

409
Roads in Chiba Prefecture
Roads in Kanagawa Prefecture